Avril Hoare is a news presenter and reporter from Coolock in Dublin, Ireland. She has worked in the RTÉ Newsroom since 1999.

She was a regular presenter of 2fm news and has been a reporter on RTÉ Radio 1's News at One. In 2001, she became part of 2fm's The Full Irish team. She also was a stand in for Gerry Ryan in his absence from Irish radio, including the summer months. Previously, Avril worked in commercial radio and local newspapers. She began her career in RTÉ as a freelance contributor to the 2fm Drivetime show. She used to present 2fm's Newsbeat bulletins which were broadcast from Monday to Friday at 1 pm, 4pm and 7 pm.

Avril also used to host her own show, which was a mix of chat and music, on 2fm on Friday evenings at 7 pm.

She is currently working in RTÉ Radio 1's This Week as a reporter/presenter.

External links

Place of birth missing (living people)
Year of birth missing (living people)
Living people
People from Coolock
Irish women journalists
Irish women radio presenters
RTÉ newsreaders and journalists
21st-century Irish journalists
Radio personalities from the Republic of Ireland